Ark in the Park may refer to:

Ark in the Park (conservation project), an open sanctuary and conservation project in the Waitākere Ranges near Auckland, New Zealand
Ark in the Park, segment of the American television show Ray Rayner and His Friends by Ray Rayner
Ark in the Park, a 1994 children's book by Wendy Orr
The Ark in the Park: The Zoo in the Nineteenth Century, a 1976 book by Wilfrid Jasper Walter Blunt
The Ark in the Park: The Story of Lincoln Park Zoo, a 2003 book by Mark Rosenthal, Carol Tauber, and Edward Uhlir